In Spite of Danger is a 1935 American action film directed by Lambert Hillyer and written by Anthony Coldeway. The film stars Wallace Ford, Marian Marsh, Arthur Hohl, Charley Grapewin, Charles Middleton and Edward LeSaint. The film was released on March 8, 1935, by Columbia Pictures.

Plot

Cast           
Wallace Ford as Bob Crane
Marian Marsh as Sally Sullivan
Arthur Hohl as Steve Lynch
Charley Grapewin as Pop Sullivan
Charles Middleton as Mr. Merritt
Edward LeSaint as Dr. Daley
Dick Wessel as Monk Grady
Jay Ward as Tommy Sullivan

References

External links
 

1935 films
American action films
1930s action films
Columbia Pictures films
Films directed by Lambert Hillyer
American black-and-white films
1930s English-language films
1930s American films